Sosnovka is a rural locality (a selo) in Sosnovsky Selsoviet, Zarinsky District, Altai Krai, Russia. The population was 441 as of 2013. There are 6 streets.

Geography 
Sosnovka is located 48 km northeast of Zarinsk (the district's administrative centre) by road. Malinovka is the nearest rural locality.

References 

Rural localities in Zarinsky District